Edoardo Pacini (born 4 August 1991) is an Italian footballer who plays for Italian four division club Teramo, on loan from Parma.

Biography
Born in Sant'Elpidio a Mare, Marche, Pacini started his career at Marche side Ascoli. In summer 2011 he left for Serie D club Salernitana. However, he was released on 16 December 2011. On 7 February 2012 he was presented as a new player of Lega Pro Seconda Divisione team Treviso. In summer 2012 he was signed by Bellaria.

References

External links
 Football.it Profile 
 FIGC 

Italian footballers
Ascoli Calcio 1898 F.C. players
U.S. Salernitana 1919 players
Treviso F.B.C. 1993 players
A.C. Bellaria Igea Marina players
S.S. Teramo Calcio players
Association football midfielders
Sportspeople from the Province of Fermo
1991 births
Living people
Footballers from Marche
People from Sant'Elpidio a Mare